The Hampden–Sydney vs. Randolph–Macon rivalry is a sports rivalry between the Hampden–Sydney College Tigers and the Randolph–Macon College Yellow Jackets. The college football rivalry between the NCAA Division III schools, often known simply as "The Game", dates to 1893 and has been called the oldest small-school rivalry in the Southern United States. The rivalry now crosses all sports, with the men's basketball series in particular gaining national attention.

Football

The college football rivalry between Hampden–Sydney College and Randolph–Macon College dates to 1893. The game was played on Hampden–Sydney's campus, as the previous year President Richard McIlwaine had banned the team from traveling to keep them from "vicious temptations and surroundings"; Randolph–Macon was one of the only teams willing to travel to Hampden–Sydney without potential reciprocation. Randolph–Macon won the game 12–6. Since then, the two teams have met 126 times (no games were played in 1943 and 1944) in what has been called the South's oldest small-school rivalry. Hampden–Sydney's longest streak without losing is 14 games, from 1915 through 1926. Likewise, Randolph–Macon's longest streak without losing is 9 games, which the Yellow Jackets have done twice - from 1930 through 1938 and again from 2014 to 2022.  Hampden–Sydney has won 8 of the top 10 largest point-differential games with the widest margin being by 62 points and the lowest being 32; Randolph–Macon has won by over 30 points twice—in 1997 by 31 and in 2019 by 42. Since 2011, the Yellow Jackets have won 10 games and the Tigers 1. Hampden–Sydney leads the series 58–57–11 with Randolph-Macon winning the most recent matchup on November 12, 2022 to extend its current winning streak to nine games. Also, Randolph-Macon earned 10 wins with the victory, the most in school history.

Known to fans simply as "The Game", it is by far the highest profile matchup on either team's schedule. It is played in November as the final game of each team's regular football season. It often decides the champion of the ODAC. Being only 78 miles from each other and within an hour of Richmond, Virginia, the two NCAA Division III non-scholarship schools overlap in their recruiting pool, heightening the rivalry particularly in Richmond, where thousands of alumni from both colleges reside. The year-round nature of the rivalry has led fans to consider "The Game" the highlight of the schedule.

On November 24, 2020, the 1984 football victory over Hampden Sydney was voted by Randolph Macon alumni and fans as the greatest football game in the history of Randolph Macon dating back to 1891. In this game, Randolph Macon’s defense forced five turnovers which allowed the explosive and record breaking offense to score 31 points in a 31-10 victory. This win allowed Randolph Macon Macon to advance to the NCAA playoffs for the first time in the school’s history finishing the regular season ranked #5 in the nation and #1 in the NCAA South Region.   During the historic 1984 season, Randolph Macon wide receiver Keith Gilliam broke the all time NCAA record by having nine consecutive receptions for touchdowns.

Game results

Men's basketball
While the football matchup has the most history, the rivalry has extended across all sports in which the schools compete, and since the 1990s the men's basketball series has gained national attention. Since that time both schools have been national Division III contenders, with both ranked in the top ten in multiple years. As such, the games often have championship implications for one or both teams. In 2003 the #1 Yellow Jackets beat the #3 Tigers in a game that sold out weeks prior; in 2007 Hampden–Sydney derailed Randolph–Macon's postseason hopes with a playoff victory after being swept in the regular season. Both teams were in the top ten in 2004 when the #8 Yellow Jackets upset the undefeated, first-ranked Tigers. In 2021, #1 ranked Randolph-Macon defeated Hampden-Sydney 79-65, but the return contest was cancelled due to COVID-19. The Yellow Jackets finished the season with a 12-0 record, an ODAC championship, and the #1 ranking in the final D3Hoops.com poll. The following season, Randolph-Macon defeated Hampden-Sydney twice, en route to a perfect 16-0 ODAC record. The Yellow Jackets won the ODAC tournament and the Division III national championship with a 33-1 overall record, the first national title in school history.

Notes

References

College basketball rivalries in the United States
College football rivalries in the United States
College sports rivalries in the United States
Hampden–Sydney Tigers football
Randolph–Macon Yellow Jackets football
Recurring sporting events established in 1893
1893 establishments in Virginia